Honan, is an Irish surname, possibly originating in County Clare.

Notable people
Notable people with this surname include:
 Bob Honan, Australian rugby player
 Cathy Honan, Irish politician
 Colm Honan, Irish hurler
 Darach Honan, Irish hurler
 Dermot Honan, Irish politician
 Kevin Honan, American politician
 Marty Honan, American baseball player
 Park Honan, American academic
 T. V. Honan, Irish politician
 Thomas M. Honan, American politician
 Tras Honan, Irish politician

References

Surnames of Irish origin